Anderson House is a historic home located at Haymakertown, Botetourt County, Virginia. It was built about 1828, and is a two-story, central-passage-plan dwelling with an unusual asymmetrical four-bay principal facade. A two-story brick west wing and a single story frame ell, were added in 1969.  Also on the property are a contributing early 19th-century meathouse, a small frame, early 20th-century barn, and the site of a 19th-century mill pond.

It was listed on the National Register of Historic Places in 1999.

References

Houses on the National Register of Historic Places in Virginia
Federal architecture in Virginia
Houses completed in 1828
Houses in Botetourt County, Virginia
National Register of Historic Places in Botetourt County, Virginia